Hyon Jong-hyok (born 31 March 1993) is a North Korean former footballer. He represented North Korea on at least one occasion in 2014.

Career statistics

International

References

1993 births
Living people
North Korean footballers
North Korea international footballers
Association football defenders